Ace Townsend Adams (March 2, 1910 – February 26, 2006) was a pitcher in Major League Baseball who played for the New York Giants (1941–46). Adams batted and threw right-handed. He was born in Willows, California.

In a six-season career, Adams posted a 41–33 record with a 3.47 ERA and 49 saves in 302 games pitched. Much of his work came as a relief pitcher.

Adams died in Albany, Georgia, at age 95.

See also
 List of Major League Baseball annual saves leaders

References

External links

Ace Adams at SABR (Baseball BioProject)

1910 births
2006 deaths
Major League Baseball pitchers
New York Giants (NL) players
National League All-Stars
Baseball players from California
People from Glenn County, California
Minor league baseball managers
Rayne Red Sox players
Jeanerette Blues players
Lake Charles Skippers players
Cordele Reds players
Winston-Salem Twins players
Nashville Vols players
Fitzgerald Pioneers players
Azules de Veracruz players
American expatriate baseball players in Mexico